The lesser Papuan pipistrelle (Pipistrellus papuanus) is a species of vesper bat. It can be found in Indonesia and Papua New Guinea.

References

Pipistrellus
Mammals described in 1881
Taxa named by Giacomo Doria
Taxa named by Wilhelm Peters
Bats of Oceania
Mammals of Papua New Guinea
Mammals of Western New Guinea
Taxonomy articles created by Polbot
Bats of New Guinea